, provisional designation , is a stony asteroid, slow rotator and suspected tumbler on a highly eccentric orbit, classified as near-Earth object and potentially hazardous asteroid of the Amor and Apollo group, respectively. It was discovered on 31 August 2003, by astronomers of the Near-Earth Asteroid Tracking program at the Haleakala Observatory in Hawaii, United States. The Q-type asteroid has a rotation period of 114.4 hours and possibly an elongated shape.

Orbit and classification 

 is a member of the Apollo group of asteroids, which are Earth-crossing asteroids. They are the largest group of near-Earth objects with approximately 10 thousand known members. As it just grazes the orbit of Earth, the Minor Planet Center (MPC), groups it to the non-Earth crossing Amor asteroids.

It orbits the Sun at a distance of 1.015–3.3 AU once every 3 years and 1 month (1,140 days; semi-major axis of 2.14 AU). Its orbit has an eccentricity of 0.52 and an inclination of 12° with respect to the ecliptic. The body's observation arc begins with a precovery taken at the Siding Spring Observatory on in July 1981, more than 18 years prior to its official discovery observation at Haleakala.

Close approaches 

On the Torino Scale, this object was rated level 1 in early October 2003, and removed on 13 October 2003.

In 2034, 2037 and 2062, it will pass Earth at a distance of 0.18 AU, 0.44 AU and 0.045 AU, respectively. It frequently approaches Jupiter at 1.7–2.0 AU as well.

Physical characteristics 

 has been characterized as an uncommon Q-type asteroid, that falls into the larger stony S-complex.

Slow rotator and tumbler 

Several rotational lightcurve of this asteroid were obtained from photometric observations during its close approach to the Earth in 2009. Analysis of the best-rated lightcurve – obtained by Brian Warner at his Palmer Divide Observatory in collaboration with Robert Stephens and Albino Carbognani – gave a well-defined rotation period of 114.4 hours with a high brightness amplitude of 1.60 magnitude, which is indicative of an elongated shape. With a period of more than 100 hours,  is a slow rotator as most asteroids typically rotate every 2 to 20 hours once around their axis. The asteroid also shows several characteristics of a non-principal axis-rotation, which is commonly known as tumbling.

This asteroid has also been studied by radar at the Goldstone and Arecibo observatories by Lance Benner and Mike Nolan.

Diameter and albedo 

According to post-cryogenic observations made by the Spitzer Space Telescope during the ExploreNEOs survey, this asteroid measures 2.29 and 2.31 kilometers in diameter and its surface has an albedo between 0.13 and 0.14, while the Collaborative Asteroid Lightcurve Link assumes a standard albedo for stony asteroids of 0.20 and calculates a diameter of 1.88 kilometers based on an absolute magnitude of 16.0.

Naming 

This minor planet was numbered by the MPC on 5 December 2006. As of 2018, it has not been named.

Notes

References

External links 
 PHA Close Approaches To The Earth, Minor Planet Center
 Asteroid Lightcurve Database (LCDB), query form (info )
 Retracted lightcurve of (143651) 2003 QO104, René Roy, May 2009, published by Geneva Obs., Raoul Behrend
 List Of Amor Minor Planets (by designation), Minor Planet Center
 
 
 

143651
143651
143651
143651
143651
143651
20030831